Karan Jani (born May 18, 1988) is an Indian astrophysicist working on black holes, gravitational waves, and testing Albert Einstein's General Theory of Relativity. He is part of the LIGO team which led to the first observation of gravitational waves from binary black hole merger. He was one of the approximately 1200 authors of a paper on the subject in Physical Review D   He was also one of the 3 authors of  a paper in Nature reporting a specific approach for observing an elusive class of black holes called Intermediate black holes. He has worked at the LIGO Livingston Observatory in the US, the Albert Einstein Institute in Germany, the Georgia Institute of Technology, and the Perimeter Institute for Theoretical Physics in Canada. He is a member of the Indian Initiative in Gravitational-wave Observations effort to build gravitational wave detector LIGO in India.

Early life and education 
Karan was born in Mumbai, India and did his K-12 schooling in Baroda, Gujarat. He attended Maharaja Sayajirao University before joining Penn State from where he obtained his degrees in physics, astronomy, astrophysics along with a minor in mathematics. He is currently a graduate student at the Georgia Institute of Technology. He has previously held undergraduate research positions at the Institute of Gravitation and Cosmos at Penn State, Max Planck Institute for Gravitational Physics and Perimeter Institute for Theoretical Physics.

He was part of the delegation that met with the Prime Minister of India Narendra Modi in Washington, DC, for the signing of  the MoU between National Science Foundation and Department of Atomic Energy to build a LIGO detector in India.

Awards and recognition 

 Forbes 30 Under 30 recipient in Science - 2017
 Jani was a co-recipient of the Special Breakthrough Prize in Fundamental Physics, awarded to "Сontributors who are authors of the paper Observation of Gravitational Waves from a Binary Black Hole Merger (Physical Review Letters, 11 February 2016) and contributors who also made important contributions to the success of LIGO." - 2016

See also 
 Gravitational-wave astronomy
 Gravitational-wave observatory

References

External links 
 Karan Jani's Website

1988 births
20th-century Indian astronomers
Living people